The Secretary of State for Health and Social Services was a position in the UK cabinet, created on 1 November 1968 with responsibility for the Department of Health and Social Security. It continued until 25 July 1988 when Department of Health and the Department of Social Security were created.

Though when created the position had responsibility for the National Health Service throughout England and Wales, responsibility for the NHS in Wales was transferred to the Secretary of State for Wales in 1969.

Secretaries of State
Colour key (for political parties):

References

Lists of government ministers of the United Kingdom
Defunct ministerial offices in the United Kingdom